Rhonda LaChanze Sapp, known professionally as LaChanze (born December 16, 1961), is an American actress, singer, and dancer. She won the Tony Award for Best Actress in a Leading Role in a Musical in 2006 for her role as Celie Harris Johnson in The Color Purple.

Early life and education

Born in St. Augustine, Florida, to Walter and Rosalie Sapp, her stage name "LaChanze" (Creole: the charmed one) is taken from her grandmother. After moving to Connecticut, her childhood love of singing and dancing caused her mother to enroll her in the Bowen Peters Cultural Arts Center in New Haven. There she discovered her love for performing.  At Warren Harding High School in Bridgeport, LaChanze made her debut as Lola in the school production of Damn Yankees.

After high school, LaChanze studied drama at Morgan State University in Baltimore, Maryland, before transferring to the University of the Arts in Philadelphia, where she studied Theater and Dance.

Career
Her first summer job was as a tap dancer in the ensemble of Uptown... It's Hot! at the Tropicana Hotel in Atlantic City, New Jersey. The show opened on Broadway in January 1986, where LaChanze began her professional career in the theater.

LaChanze played the role of Ti Moune in the Lynn Ahrens and Stephen Flaherty musical Once on This Island in 1990 and received nominations for the Tony Award as Best Actress in a Featured Role in a Musical and Drama Desk Award as Outstanding Actress in a Leading Role in a Musical. In December 1998, she joined the cast of the Ahrens and Flaherty and Terrence McNally Broadway musical Ragtime,  replacing Audra McDonald in the role of "Sarah." She played the role of Viveca in the Playwrights Horizons Off-Broadway production of the musical The Bubbly Black Girl Sheds Her Chameleon Skin, which opened in June 2000. She received a Drama Desk nomination, Actress (Musical), for her performance. LaChanze participated in an Actors Fund of America benefit concert of Funny Girl, with many performers portraying the character of Fanny Brice, in September 2002.

In 2005 she played a runaway slave in the Ahrens and Flaherty musical Dessa Rose. The musical opened Off-Broadway at the Mitzi Newhouse Theatre at Lincoln Center in March 2005. LaChanze received an Obie Award for Performance for Dessa Rose. LaChanze appeared as Celie Harris Johnson in the Broadway musical The Color Purple, from its opening in 2005 to November 2006. She won the Tony Award for Best Actress in a Leading Role in a Musical for this performance.

In September 2008 she participated in the Boston Pops concert, Handel's Messiah Rocks at Emerson College. The performance was filmed by Public Broadcasting Service. She was in the Off-Broadway production of Inked Baby, written by Christina Anderson, which opened in March 2009 at Playwrights Horizons Peter Jay Sharp Theater. In June and July 2009, she played the role of Glinda in the City Center Encores! staged Summer Stars concert production of The Wiz.

She published her first picture book, Little Diva, in 2010. She was in the Broadway production of If/Then in 2014, starring as Kate. In 2018, she was in Summer: The Donna Summer Musical on Broadway, playing Diva Donna/Mary Gaines. In 2019 she appeared in A Christmas Carol on Broadway, starring as the Ghost of Christmas Present.

In January 2022, Lachanze took a star turn in TROUBLE IN MIND, written by Alice Childress in 1955. Lachanze earned a Tony nomination for her performance as Wiletta Mayer.

In 2022, Lachanze began her career as a Broadway Producer.  She is producing TOPDOG UNDERDOG with David Stone, Rashad V. Chambers, Marc Platt, Debra Martin Chase, and the Shubert Organization. 

She is also produced KIMBERLY AKIMBO on Broadway with David Stone, Aaron Glick, Patrick Catullo and James L. Nederlander.

Personal life 
While LaChanze was eight months pregnant with her second child, Zaya, her husband, securities trader Calvin Gooding, was killed in the September 11, 2001 attacks. He was working at Cantor Fitzgerald in Tower One of the World Trade Center.

On September 6, 2002, she sang the National Anthem at a joint meeting of Congress in Federal Hall National Memorial, the first meeting of Congress in New York since 1790. She sang "Amazing Grace" at the dedication of the National September 11 Memorial & Museum on May 15, 2014, dedicating her performance to her late husband.

LaChanze remarried in 2005 to Derek Fordjour, and divorced him in 2014. The divorce was finalized on March 27, 2014, in Westchester County.

In 2019, LaChanze and the elder of her two daughters, Celia Rose Gooding, made history by becoming the first mother and daughter ever to perform on Broadway at the same time, with LaChanze starring in A Christmas Carol and Gooding starring in Jagged Little Pill.

Acting credits
Sources: The New York Times; TCM

Film

Television

Theatre

Video games

Discography 
Once On This Island (Original Broadway Cast Recording), 1990
Disney's Princess Favorites, featured artist, 2002
Dessa Rose (off-Broadway Cast Recording), 2005
The Color Purple (Original Broadway Cast Recording), 2006
Disney Collection 1, featured artist, 2006
The Bubbly Black Girl Sheds Her Chameleon Skin (Studio Cast Recording), 2007
Handel's Messiah Rocks: A Joyful Noise, featured artist, 2009
Nice Fighting You: A 30th Anniversary Celebration Live at 54 Below, featured on four songs, 2014
If/Then (Original Broadway Cast Recording), 2014
Summer: The Donna Summer Musical (Original Broadway Cast Recording), 2018

Concerts
September 6, 2002 - Federal Hall National Memorial
2008 - Handel's Messiah Rocks, Emerson College
Dec 1 & 2, 2008 - Joe's Pub
December 5, 2010 - Playhouse Square Center
December 16, 2012 - Birdland
May 15, 2014 - National September 11 Memorial and Museum
February 13, 2015 - Kennedy Center
2016/17 - Feeling Good Tour

Accolades

References

External links
 
 
 
 
 LaChanze - Downstage Center interview at American Theatre Wing.org

1961 births
20th-century American actresses
21st-century American actresses
Actresses from Connecticut
Actresses from Florida
African-American actresses
20th-century African-American women singers
American women singers
American musical theatre actresses
Living people
Morgan State University alumni
People from St. Augustine, Florida
Theatre World Award winners
Tony Award winners
University of the Arts (Philadelphia) alumni
21st-century African-American women
21st-century African-American people